State Road 446 (SR 446) is a short highway in Lawrence and Monroe counties in southern Indiana, United States. Though it is an even-numbered route, it is actually a north–south highway.

Route description
SR 446 connects State Road 46 on the east side of Bloomington with U.S. Route 50 in eastern Lawrence County. It passes over a causeway over Lake Monroe and through the Hoosier National Forest.

Major intersections

See also

 List of state roads in Indiana
 List of highways numbered 446

References

External links

446
Transportation in Lawrence County, Indiana
Transportation in Monroe County, Indiana